Diena (The Day) is a Latvian language national daily newspaper in Latvia, published since 23 November 1990. It is one of Latvia's largest daily periodicals and used to be considered as a paper of record. Following the change of ownership in 2008, many of the newspaper's staff resigned and founded the weekly newspaper Ir in 2010.

The newspaper was initially founded as the official paper of the Supreme Council of the Republic of Latvia. Since privatisation in 1993, Diena was owned by Swedish media group Bonnier. In 2009, AS Diena together with its sister business daily Dienas Bizness was sold to investor group owned by Jonathan and David Rowland. The Latvian businessman Viesturs Koziols 6 August 2010 acquired a 51% stake in the joint-stock company Diena.

In 2002, the publisher was fined for articles published in 1998 and criticizing then-minister for economy Laimonis Strujevičs. In 2007, the European Court of Human Rights held the fine to be in violation of freedom of expression.

Diena had 18,277 subscribers in December 2009, down from 26,866 in February 2009, and 41,471 in April 2000. It shifted from berliner to compact format in 2007. The newspaper's Russian language edition was discontinued in 2000.

Bojārs left his position at the end of 2012, sociologist Aigars Freimanis replaced him in his position only for four months, but from May 10, 2013 Gatis Madžiņš became the chief editor of the newspaper.

References

External links
  

European Court of Human Rights cases involving Latvia
Newspapers published in Latvia
Companies based in Riga
Mass media in Riga
1990 establishments in Latvia
Publications established in 1990